Rear-Admiral Hugh Maxwell Balfour  (29 April 1933 – 29 June 1999) was a Scottish Royal Navy officer.

Early life
Hugh Balfour was born in Malta into a Royal Navy family on 29 April 1933, and received his early formal education at Ardvreck School, Crieff, and at Kelly College, Tavistock.

Early naval career
He joined the Royal Navy in 1951, and qualified as a signal officer in 1959.

From 1965 to 1967 he served as staff officer operations and senior communications officer to the senior naval officer West Indies (Snowi). He then went on to command , and took part in the Beira Patrol off the coast of Mozambique.

From 1972 to 1974 he was the commander of HMY Britannia. In 1974 he was appointed as a Lieutenant of the Royal Victorian Order.

On his return to the United Kingdom he was appointed Deputy-Director of Command, Control and Communications. He then served as the Royal Navy's Chief Signals Officer from 1979 to 1981.

Falklands War
Balfour was the Captain of  when the Argentine Armed Forces militarily invaded the Falkland Islands on 2 April 1982. Exeter was on duty at that moment in the Caribbean, acting as a guardship for British troops protecting Belize from aggression from the Government of Guatemala. Whilst waiting for orders he prepared the ship for battle with a series of war exercises.

On route Exeter had a secret meeting with the tanker British Esk to refuel, and Balfour received a tactical briefing from Sam Salt, the captain of sunk HMS Sheffield (who was returning with his surviving crew to England) on the naval battle situation raging in the Falklands, where the Royal Navy was under repeat air assaults from fighter jets of the Argentine Navy and Air Force. Exeter reached the Falklands and joined the task force on 22 May 1982, during the British amphibious assault landings to retake the Islands at San Carlos water. Exeter's primary role was to protect the task force, and provide early warning of incoming hostile aircraft and missiles using her Type 1022 Radar. During the fighting over the next three weeks she shot down two attacking Argentine A-4C Skyhawks on 30 May 1982, and a hostile Learjet 35A on 7 June 1982 using her Sea Dart missile system. The conflict ended with the British capture of Port Stanley on 14 June 1982.

Later career
From 1983 to 1985 Balfour was director of the Maritime Tactical School and promoted to Rear-Admiral. Between 1985 and 1990 he was Commander of the Royal Navy of Oman, and awarded the Order of Oman on his retirement. In 1990 he was also appointed a Companion of the Order of the Bath.

Post-military career
On his retirement from the Royal Navy he became a communications consultant.

Death
Balfour died from the effects of a cancer on 29 June 1999 in his 67th year.

Personal life
He married Sheila Ann Weldon in 1958, the marriage producing two daughters and a son.

References

Royal Navy rear admirals
Lieutenants of the Royal Victorian Order
Companions of the Order of the Bath
1933 births
1999 deaths
People educated at Kelly College
People educated at Ardvreck School